Once & Future is a horror comic by Kieron Gillen, with art by Dan Mora and colors by Tamra Bonvillain, about King Arthur. It is published by Boom! Studios.

Synopsis
When a group of British nationalists perform a supernatural ritual in order to resurrect King Arthur, they discover that Arthur has his own agenda. As Arthur leaves a trail of death and destruction in his wake, octogenarian Bridgette McGuire — a retired monster hunter — and her grandson Duncan must try to stop him before other creatures from story begin emerging as well.

Reception
The first Once & Future trade paperback (Once & Future: The King is Undead, comprising issues #1-6) was a finalist for the 2021 Hugo Award for Best Graphic Story, and the third trade paperback (Once & Future: The Parliament of Magpies) is a finalist for the 2022 award.

Screen Rant calls it "(t)he best modern King Arthur adaptation", because it is set in the present day and "explores the power of stories" rather than "the myths themselves".

Comic Book Resources considers it "a more successful adaptation [of Arthurian mythos] than most", and posits that this is because Gillen "plays fast and loose with Arthurian legend" and acknowledges that there is no single canonical version.

Collected Editions 
Boom! Studios has collected issues of Once & Future as trade paperbacks:

 Once & Future - Volume One: The King is Undead
 Once & Future - Volume Two: Old English
 Once & Future - The Parliament Of Magpies
 Once & Future - Monarchies In The UK

References

Horror comics
Arthurian comics